Nationality words link to articles with information on the nation's poetry or literature (for instance, Irish or France).

Events
 March — American poet Phillis Wheatley, visits with General George Washington for half an hour in Cambridge, Massachusetts, after sending him the previous October a poem written in his honor. A former slave, she was a strong supporter of independence during the American Revolution. The poem was published March 26 in the Virginia Gazette

Works published

United Kingdom
 James Beattie, Poems on Several Occasions
 Richard Graves, Euphrosyne; or, Amusements on the Road of Life
 David Herd, editor, Ancient and Modern Scottish Songs, anthology
 William Mickle, translator, The Lusiad; or, The Discovery of India, translated from the original Portuguese of Luis de Camoens
 Hannah More, Sir Eldred of the Bower, and The Bleeding Rock
 Jonathan Richardson, Morning Thoughts; or, Poetical Meditations, Moral, Divine and Miscellaneous
 John Scott, Amwell
 Augustus Montague Toplady, Psalms and Hymns for Public and Private Worship
 William Whitehead, Variety, published anonymously

Other
 Johannes Ewald, a funeral ode on the occasion of the death of Frederik V; Denmark
 Basilio da Gama, Os Campos Elíseos ("The Elysian Fields"), on the fine arts; Brazil
 Vincenzo Monti, La visione di Ezechiello, Italy
 Jonathan Odell, "A Birthday Song", United States

Births
Death years link to the corresponding "[year] in poetry" article:
 April 17 – Jean-François Roger (died 1842), French poet and politician
 April 21 (bapt.) – Ann Griffiths  (died 1805), Welsh hymn-writer
 July 18 – John Struthers (died 1853), Scottish poet
 September 21 – John Fitchett (died 1838), English epic poet
 November 16 – Mary Matilda Betham (died 1852), English diarist, scholar and poet
 year not certain – Charles Newton

Deaths
Birth years link to the corresponding "[year] in poetry" article:
 January 26 – Evan Lloyd (born 1734), Welsh satirical poet and clergyman
 June 13 – Elizabeth Scott (born 1708), British-born, Colonial American poet and hymnwriter
 August 28? (bur.) – John Edwards (Sion y Potlau) (born 1699?), Welsh poet
 date not known – George Smith (born 1713), British
 Jeanne-Catherine Van Goethem (born 1720), Flemish poet

See also

 List of years in poetry
 List of years in literature
 18th century in poetry
 18th century in literature
 French literature of the 18th century
 Sturm und Drang (the conventional translation is "Storm and Stress"; a more literal translation, however, might be "storm and urge", "storm and longing", "storm and drive" or "storm and impulse"), a movement in German literature (including poetry) and music from the late 1760s through the early 1780s
 List of years in poetry
 Poetry

Notes

18th-century poetry
Poetry